Reginald Lee was a lookout on The Titanic.

Reginald Lee may also refer to:
 Reggie Lee (actor) (born 1975), American actor
 Reggie Lee (American football) (born 1973), Arena Football League player